Dousmanis is a Greek surname. Notable people with the surname include:

Sofoklis Dousmanis (1868–1952), Greek naval officer, brother of Viktor
Viktor Dousmanis (1861–1949), Greek military officer

Greek-language surnames